A scanning mobility particle sizer (SMPS) is an analytical instrument that measures the size and number concentration of aerosol particles with diameters from 2.5 nm to 1000 nm. They employ a continuous, fast-scanning technique to provide high-resolution measurements.

Applications
The particles that are investigated can be of biological or chemical nature. The instrument can be used for air quality measurement indoors, vehicle exhaust, research in bioaerosols, atmospheric studies, and toxicology testing.

References

Spectrometers
Electronic test equipment
Signal processing
Measuring instruments
Laboratory equipment
Aerosols
Aerosol measurement